"Lean on Me" is a song by American gospel artist Kirk Franklin. Released in 1998, the song greatly helped ascend Kirk Franklin's album The Nu Nation Project. The Nu Nation Project went on to top the Billboard Contemporary Christian Albums chart for 23 weeks and the Billboard Gospel Albums chart for 49 weeks, and brought Franklin his third Grammy.

History
Released as the first single in 1998, "Lean on Me" helped catapult The Nu Nation Project to becoming a 2× platinum gospel album. The single is also an interpretation of the Bill Withers song “"Lean on Me”. The song was a collaboration with artists Bono, Mary J. Blige, Crystal Lewis, and R. Kelly. The song was heavily praised for reaching both the gospel and secular radio.  1.5 million copies of the single have been sold to date and the single was nominated for Song of the Year Category for the 41st Grammy Awards. The single was also nominated for Best R&B Song and Best R&B Performance by a Duo or Group with Vocal.

Kirk performed "Lean On Me" at the Grammy Awards in Los Angeles on 24 February before a TV audience of 1.5 billion people alongside Bono, Gerald Levert, Crystal Lewis, and Mary J. Blige.

Live performances
"Lean on Me" was performed at the 41st Grammy Awards.

See also
Gospel Music
Kirk Franklin

References

1998 singles
Kirk Franklin songs
1998 songs
RCA Records singles